Leonardo Mayer defended his title over Portuguese Pedro Sousa 6–4, 7–5.

Seeds

Draw

Finals

Top half

Bottom half

References

 Main Draw
 Qualifying Draw

Challenger Ciudad de Guayaquil - Singles
2013 Singles